The 40th Annual Japan Record Awards took place on December 31, 1998, starting at 6:30PM JST. The primary ceremonies were televised in Japan on TBS.

Award winners 
Japan Record Award:
Tetsuya Komuro (producer) & globe for "Wanna Be A Dreammaker"
Best Vocalist:
Ichiro Toba
Best New Artist:
Morning Musume
Best Album:
Every Little Thing for "Time to Destination"
Special Award:
Céline Dion
hide

External links
Official Website

Japan Record Awards
Japan Record Awards
Japan Record Awards
Japan Record Awards
1998